Stranger Heads Prevailis the second album by progressive rock band Thank You Scientist. It was released on July 29, 2016. It is the first album to feature Cody McCorry on bass and theremin and the final album to feature Odin Alvarez, Andrew Digrius, and Ellis Jasenovic on drums, trumpet, and saxophone, respectively, prior to their departure in 2017.

Track listing

Personnel 
Thank You Scientist
 Salvatore Marrano – vocals
 Tom Monda – fretted and fretless guitar, acoustic guitar, shamisen, sitar, vocals, strings arrangement
 Cody McCorry – bass, theremin, saw
 Ben Karas – violin, viola, five string electric violin
 Ellis Jasenovic – tenor sax
 Andrew Digrius – trumpet, flugelhorn
 Odin Alvarez – drums

Additional personnel
 Mark Radice – vocals, piano, keys
 AJ Merlino – percussion (mallets and hands)
 Sean Redman – timpani
 Gergly Kiss – cello
 Tory Anne Daines – viola
 Rebecca Harris – violin
 Bumblefoot – vocals on "Prologue: A Faint Applause"
 The Spectrum Vocal Ensemble – gang vocals

Production
 Tom Monda – production
 Mike Ferretti – mixing, engineering
 Shane Stanton – assistance
 Van Dette – mastering
 Bumblefoot – additional vocal engineering on "Prologue: A Faint Applause" and "Epilogue"
 Tim High – additional vocal engineering on "Prologue" and "Epilogue: And the Clever Depart"

Charts

References

2016 albums
Thank You Scientist albums